Matthew Walsh may refer to:
Matthew Walsh (cyclist) (1887–1975), British Olympic cyclist
Matt Walsh (basketball) (born 1982), former National Basketball Association player
Matt Walsh (comedian) (born 1964), American comedian and actor, founding member of the Upright Citizens Brigade
Matt Walsh (political commentator) (born 1986), right-wing political commentator and show host for The Daily Wire

See also
Matthew Welsh (disambiguation)